Shabaa is a Syrian village located in Markaz Rif Dimashq, in al-Malihah Subdistrict. Shabaa had a population of 13,446 in the 2004 census.

References

Populated places in Markaz Rif Dimashq District